Harbour View may refer to:

Places

Jamaica
 Harbour View, Jamaica, a community at the eastern extreme of the city of Kingston, Jamaica.

New Zealand
 Harbour View, New Zealand, a suburb of Lower Hutt, New Zealand.

Schools
 Harbour View Elementary School, a public school on the north end of Dartmouth, Nova Scotia, Canada.
 Harbour View High School, a high school located in Saint John, New Brunswick.

Sport
 Harbour View F.C., a Jamaican football club that currently plays in the Digicel Premier League.
 Harbour View Stadium, the home stadium of Harbour View F.C.

Television
 Hell Has Harbour Views, a 2005 Australian television movie.